Al Nashwa (النشوة ) is a village of Basrah Governorate on the east bank of the Shatt Al-Arab River in southern Iraq. 

It is a service center for the nearby oil fields, and the United States Army had a base near the town.

References

Populated places in Basra Province